Case History is the debut solo album by artist British rock musician Kevin Coyne, released in 1972 on Dandelion Records. It was in part inspired by his work at Whittingham Hospital, in Preston, Lancashire.

In January 2013 the album was re-released by Cherry Red Records.

The track "Sand All Yellow" also appears on the 1972 Dandelion compilation album There Is Some Fun Going Forward.

Reception
Toby Manning in Record Collector magazine praised Coyne's reflection on his experiences with the mentally ill within the album and his songwriting.

Track listing
All tracks composed by Kevin Coyne :

Personnel

Musicians 
 Kevin Coyne – guitar, vocals
 Ron Brown – trombone
 John Chichester – guitar
 Dave Clague – bass, guitar
 Nick Cudworth	– guitar, piano
 Tat Meager – drums
 Mick Sweeney – guitar

Production
 Kevin Coyne – Drawing, producer
 Dave Clague – producer
 Nick Cudworth	– paintings
 Andy Morten – design, layout
 Simon Murphy – remastering
 Clive Selwood – technician
 John Reed – coordination, interviewer
 Clive Selwood – production supervisor
 Ray Stevenson – photography

References

External links 
 Case History at discogs.com
  - provided by Cherry Red Records

1972 albums
Kevin Coyne albums